Zdravko Čelar (Rašinovac near Bosanski Petrovac, 15 September 1917 - Rakovac near Srbac, July 1942),  was a Yugoslav partisan, posthumously awarded with Order of the People's Hero. 

Village Čib in Vojvodina was renamed Čelarevo in his honor after World War II.

Sources 
 

1917 births
1942 deaths
Yugoslav Partisans members
Recipients of the Order of the People's Hero
People from Bosanski Petrovac
Serbs of Bosnia and Herzegovina